Rowland Perkins (July 10, 1934 – August 8, 2018) was an American talent agent. He was a co-founder and the founding president of the Creative Artists Agency (CAA).

Early life
Rowland Perkins was born on July 10, 1934 in Los Angeles, California. He graduated from Beverly Hills High School. He served in the United States Navy for two years and attended the University of California in Los Angeles, where he earned a bachelor's degree in business administration.

Career
Perkins began his career at the William Morris Agency (WMA).

Perkins co-founded Creative Artists Agency with Michael Ovitz, Ronald Meyer, William Haber and Michael S. Rosenfeld in 1975. He was its founding president. Perkins negotiated television productions for George Stevens Jr. He retired from CAA in 1993.

In 1995, Perkins founded the production company Double Eagle Entertainment. He served on the board of the Academy of Television Arts & Sciences.

Personal life and death
In 1960, Perkins married Diane Carol Smith whom he had met while they both attended UCLA. They had three daughters, Kamala, Dahra and Alexandra. They divorced in 1976.  Perkins later married Sallie James Perkins, an actress, comedian and opera singer.  His wife Sallie predeceased him in 2017.

He died of pneumonia on August 8, 2018 in Sherman Oaks, California, at age 84.

References

1934 births
2018 deaths
Beverly Hills High School alumni
University of California, Los Angeles alumni
Businesspeople from Los Angeles
American company founders
20th-century American businesspeople